Harrison Richard Young (March 13, 1930 – July 3, 2005) was an American character actor and known for playing old Ryan in Saving Private Ryan.

Career
Young gained recognition for his role as the elderly Private James Ryan in Steven Spielberg's war epic Saving Private Ryan (1998). Having starred in over 100 films and television episodes, Young's other credits include Passions, CSI: Crime Scene Investigation and Rob Zombie's House of 1000 Corpses.

Filmography

1991: Down Home (TV Series) as Lenny
1991: Reasonable Doubts (TV Series) as Drunk
1992: Waxwork II: Lost in Time as James Westbourne
1992: Guncrazy as Mr. Hickok, Howard's Dad
1992: A Child Lost Forever: The Jerry Sherwood Story (TV Movie) as Neighbor
1993: The Micronots! (TV Series) as Montgomery
1994: Marilyn, My Love
1995: ER (TV Series) as Parmelli
1996: Erotic Confessions (TV Series) as Roger Goodman, Department Store Owner
1996: Humanoids from the Deep (TV Movie) as Sergeant
1996: Children of the Corn IV: The Gathering (Video) as Drifter
1996: Ned and Stacey (TV Series) as Mr. Palmer
1996: Boston Common (TV Series) as Homeless Man
1997: The Night That Never Happened as Dad
1997: Click (TV Series) as Senator Gyrgich
1997: Butterscotch (TV Series) as Smiley
1997: True Vengeance (Video) as Sam Brown
1997: Law & Order (TV Series) as Gus
1997: Melrose Place (TV Series) as Drunk
1997: The Game as Obsequious Executive
1997: Total Security (TV Series) as Waiter #1
1997: Expose as Councilman Kaye
1997: Madam Savant as County Judge
1998: Second Skin
1998: Running Woman as Old Man
1998: The Opposite of Sex as Medical Examiner
1998: How to Make the Cruelest Month as Helpful Drunk
1998: Primary Colors as Sam
1998: Champions as Senator Able
1998: Saving Private Ryan as Old James Ryan
1998: Buffy the Vampire Slayer (TV Series) as Old Man
1998: Beverly Hills, 90210 (TV Series) as Grandpa Ed Taylor
1999: Blast from the Past as Bum
1999: Sliders (1 episode) as Henry Nichols
1999: Sabrina, the Teenage Witch (TV Series) as Vagrant
1999: Yonggary as Dr. Wendel Hughes
1999: Work with Me (TV Series) as Sullivan
1999: Durango Kids as Uncle Gus
1999: Witness Protection (TV Movie) as Mr. O'Connor, Cindy's Father
1999: Ugly Naked People Bob, Tour Guide
2000: Providence (TV Series) as Monroe Ellison
2000: The Adventures of Rocky and Bullwinkle as General Foods
2000: Crocodile (Video) as Sheriff Bowman
2000: CSI: Crime Scene Investigation (TV Series) as Judge Cohen
2000: Starforce as Wizened Council Member
2000: The Norm Show (TV Series) as Simon
2000: The Beach Boys: An American Family (TV Mini-Series) as Buddy Wilson
2000: Blue Shark Hash as Captain Jack
2001: Passions (TV Series) as Palmer Harper
2001: The Korean War (TV Series) as President Eisenhower
2001: Red as Kidnapper
2001: The West Wing (TV Series) as Senator Grissom
2002: 7th Heaven (TV Series) as Frank
2002: Bubba Ho-tep as Elvis' Roommate
2002: Demon Under Glass (Video) as James Conroy
2002: Trance as Henry Santorini
2002: Ken Park as Tate's Grandfather
2002: Hi Frank! (Chinese movie) as Frank
2003: The Lyon's Den (TV Series) as Mr. Fenderson
2003: House of 1000 Corpses as Don Willis
2003: The Last Cowboy (TV Movie) as Preacher
2003: First Watch as CIA Director
2004: Green Arrow Fan Film as Kyle Magnor
2005: One More Round as Mr. Rexosovich
2005: Inheritance as Grandfather
2005: Kiss Kiss Bang Bang as Harmony's Dad
2005: The Pleasure Drivers as John
2006: Cracking Up (TV Series) as Bob Briscoe
2008: The Flyboys as Grandpa Thomas (final film role)

External links

Harrison Young Memorial Page
 

1930 births
2005 deaths
Male actors from Michigan
American male film actors
American male television actors
People from Port Huron, Michigan
20th-century American male actors
21st-century American male actors